Genet or Genêt may refer to:

Aircraft
Armstrong Siddeley Genet, aircraft engine
Armstrong Siddeley Genet Major, aircraft engine

Animals and plants
Genet (biology), a colony of plants, fungi or bacteria that come from a single genetic source
Genet (animal), a small predatory Old World carnivore related to the civet

People
 Genet (surname)
  Genêt, pen name of the New Yorker's Paris correspondent Janet Flanner

Places
Genet, Ethiopia, a town in southern Ethiopia

See also 
 Gené (disambiguation)
 Spanish jennet, a type of small horse